

Kodo may refer to:

Japan
 Kōdō (香道), ceremonial appreciation of incense
 Nippon Kodo (日本香堂), an incense company
 Kodō (taiko group) (鼓童), a taiko drumming group
 Kodo-kai (弘道会), a yakuza criminal organization
 The imperial way (皇道), a propaganda concept related to hakkō ichiu
 Imperial Way Faction (Kōdō-ha 皇道派), a totalitarian faction within the Imperial Japanese Army
 Kumano Kodō (熊野古道), a series of pilgrimage routes

People
 Kodo Nishimura (西村 宏堂), Buddhist monk and makeup artist
 Kodō Nomura (野村 胡堂), novelist and music critic
 Kōdō Sawaki (沢木 興道), Sōtō Zen teacher
 Junya Kodo (鼓童 淳也), mixed martial artist
 Kokuten Kōdō (高堂 国典), actor

Other
 Paspalum scrobiculatum, a type of millet grown primarily in Nepal
 Eleusine coracana, or finger millet, grown across Africa and Asia
 Kodo, Iran, a village in Fars Province, Iran

See also
 Kōdo Station (disambiguation)
 Kodos (disambiguation)